The Nevada Film Office is a Nevada state agency that promotes Nevada as a location of choice for film, entertainment, television, and multimedia production. The agency also maintains several open directories for film locations and production crews in Nevada, and offers services to connect with resources that production companies need while filming in Nevada. Since 2014, it also administers several tax credit incentives for companies that film in Nevada. 

The current director of the Nevada Film Office is Eric Preiss. The Nevada Film Office is part of the Nevada Office of Economic Development and is headquartered in Las Vegas, Nevada.

History 
Originally, the Nevada Film Office was known as the Division of Motion Pictures, and was established in 1983 as part of the commission on economic development (now known as the Office of Economic Development), where it has remained ever since. Although it is known as the Nevada Film Office in the media, most legal documents still uses the Division of Motion Pictures to refer to the agency.

See also 

 Film commission
 Film industry
 Movie production incentives in the United States
 List of Nevada State agencies
 List of films shot in Las Vegas

References

External links 
Official website
State agencies of Nevada
Film organizations in the United States